Bradyrrhoa marianella is a species of snout moth in the genus Bradyrrhoa. It was described by Ragonot in 1887, and is known from Pyrenees.

The wingspan is about 32 mm.

References

Phycitini
Moths described in 1887
Moths of Europe